Washington Column is a roughly 1800-foot high rock formation, arising from Yosemite Valley. It is east of the Royal Arches, behind the Ahwahnee Hotel. North Dome is above it. Washington Column can be viewed from many points in Yosemite Valley, including the trail to Mirror Lake.

Washington Column has numerous rock climbing routes.

References

External links and references

 Climbing on Washington Column
 More on climbing Washington Column
 Summitpost on Washington Column

Rock formations of Yosemite National Park
Granite formations
Rock formations of California
Climbing areas of California